The 1995 Tirreno–Adriatico was the 30th edition of the Tirreno–Adriatico cycle race and was held from 8 March to 15 March 1995. The race started in San Giuseppe Vesuviano and finished in San Benedetto del Tronto. The race was won by Stefano Colagè of the ZG Mobili team.

General classification

References

1995
1995 in Italian sport